The mušḫuššu (formerly also read as  or ) or mushkhushshu ( or ), is a creature from ancient Mesopotamian mythology. A mythological hybrid, it is a scaly animal with hind legs resembling the talons of an eagle, lion-like forelimbs, a long neck and tail, a horned head, a snake-like tongue, and a crest. The  most famously appears on the reconstructed Ishtar Gate of the city of Babylon, dating to the sixth century BCE.

One author, possibly following others, translates it as 'splendor serpent' ( is the Sumerian term for 'serpent'). The reading  is due to a mistransliteration of the cuneiform in early Assyriology.

History
Mušḫuššu already appears in Sumerian religion and art, as in the "Libation vase of Gudea", dedicated to Ningishzida by the Sumerian ruler Gudea (21st century BCE short chronology).

The  was the sacred animal of Marduk and his son Nabu during the Neo-Babylonian Empire. The dragon Mušḫuššu, whom Marduk once vanquished, became his symbolic animal and servant. It was taken over by Marduk from Tishpak, the local god of Eshnunna.

The constellation Hydra was known in Babylonian astronomical texts as Bašmu, 'the Serpent' (MUL.dMUŠ).

Popular culture 
It is possible that Mushu, a fictional Chinese dragon character in Disney's 1998 animated film Mulan, could have had its name and overall characterization partially inspired from this mythological creature.

See also 

 Ningishzida
 Set animal

References

Notes
1. Similar to the Set animal in Egyptian mythology and the Qilin in Chinese mythology.

External links
 The Excavations at Babylon

Archaeological artifacts
Babylonian art and architecture
Mesopotamian legendary creatures
Mythological hybrids
Offspring of Tiamat